Tax policy refers to the guidelines and principles established by a government for the imposition and collection of taxes. It encompasses both microeconomic and macroeconomic aspects, with the former focusing on issues of fairness and efficiency in tax collection, and the latter focusing on the overall quantity of taxes to be collected and its impact on economic activity. The tax framework of a country is considered a crucial instrument for influencing the country's economy.

Tax policies have significant implications for specific groups within an economy, such as households, firms, and banks. These policies are often intended to promote economic growth; however, there is significant debate among economists about the most effective ways to achieve this.

Taxation is both a political and economic issue, with political leaders often using tax policy to advance their agendas through various tax reforms, such as changes to tax rates, definitions of taxable income, and the creation of new taxes. Specific groups, such as small business owners, farmers, and retired individuals, can often exert political pressure to reduce their share of the tax burden. The tax code is often complex and includes rules that benefit certain groups of taxpayers while shifting more of the burden to others.

Main reasons for taxation 
There are some main reasons why government needs to collect taxes:

 Market failure - mainly to discourage purchases of that product (any tax creates a disincentive, so consumers will reduce their purchases and seek alternatives).
Taxes can create incentives promoting desirable behavior and disincentives for unwanted behavior. Taxes can change consumers' behavior and thus influence the market outcome. For example, in presence of externalities, an —omnipotent and ethical policymaker ≠would want to change the market outcome to reach the social optimum (otherwise there would be a deadweight loss of externality). In such a case, policymakers would implement excise taxes, carbon tax etc.
 To generate revenue.
 Taxation is the most important source of government revenue. Governments can use tax revenue to provide public services such as social security, health care, national defense, and education.
 Changing the distribution of income and wealth.
 Taxation provides a means to redistribute economic resources toward those with low income or special needs (tax revenue can be used for transfer payments such as welfare benefits).

Philosophy
Policymakers debate the nature of the tax structure they plan to implement (i.e., how progressive or regressive) and how these taxes might affect individuals and businesses (i.e., tax incidence).

The reason for this focus is economic efficiency; as advisor to the Stuart King of England Richard Petty had noted "The government does not want to kill the goose that lays the golden egg".  Paradigmatic efficient taxes are those that are either non-distortionary or lump sum.  However, economists define distortion only according to the substitution effect, because anything that does not change relative prices is non-distortionary.  One must also consider the income effect, which for tax policy purposes often needs to be assumed to cancel out in the aggregate.  The efficiency loss is depicted on the demand curve and supply curve diagrams as the area inside Harberger's Triangle.

National Insurance in the United Kingdom and Social Security in the United States are forms of social welfare funded outside their national income tax systems, paid for through worker contributions, something labeled a stealth tax by critics.

Administration
The implementation of tax policy has always been a complex business. For example, in pre-revolutionary colonial America, the argument "No taxation without representation" resulted from the tax policy of the British Crown, which taxed the settlers but offered no say in their government. A more recent American example is President George H. W. Bush's famous tax policy quote, "Read my lips: no new taxes."

<ref></</ref> Efficient tax administration encourage businesses to become formally registered, expanding the tax base and increasing revenues. An unfair tax administration can harm the tax system and reduce the government legitimacy. In many developing countries, the non-success of improving the tax administration while introducing new tax systems has led to the widespread of tax evasion and lower tax revenues. Furthermore, is important to keep rules clear and simple to encourage compliance. High tax evasion is associated with complicated tax systems. Having a well designed and simple tax system is able to increase employment, investment and transparency. Tax administration ecosystem is also changing, with the introduction of new analytical tools and technology, because of this digital information flows are increasing. Consequently, administration is operating in a way in which they increase incentives for compliant taxpayers.

Operating costs of tax policy 
Modern taxation systems have the capacity to impose a heavy burden on taxpayers, and particularly on small businesses taxpayers. That burden typically consists of three elements. Firstly, there are the taxes themselves. Secondly, there are the efficiency costs (variously referred to as deadweight losses or excess burden), the third types of costs are compliance costs of taxation, and finally, there are the administrative costs (sometimes referred to as operating costs) of the tax system. Administrative costs can be described as costs incurred by (mainly)
public sector agents in order to administer the tax-benefit system. The relationship between administrative and compliance costs of taxation is not always clear at a first glance. Sometimes, there might be an inverse relationship between them, which is a phenomenon called "The administrative-costs compliance-costs trade-off." An example of this inverse relationship might be an implementation of a self-assessment system in taxation. However, This trade-off principle is not always the reality, as it is, for example, possible to reduce both types of costs through some sort of simplification of the tax system or an increase in compliance costs might occur as a result of administrative inefficiency. These types of costs together are called operating costs of taxation.

When implementing some new parts of tax policy or reorganizing it, policymakers always have to consider the weight of administrative costs and compliance costs of taxation. There are two main types of administrative costs:

 Direct administrative costs
 Indirect administrative costs

Direct administrative costs 
Direct administrative costs are on the government side (the burden is borne by the government). "It is not immediately obvious, exactly, which activities should be attributed to the operation of the … system” (p. 19). Administrative costs are mainly connected to running the tax collection office - it includes salaries of staff, costs of legislative enactment relating to the tax system,  judicial costs of administration of the tax dispute system, and many more.

Indirect administrative costs 
Indirect administrative costs are on the side of taxpayers (the burden is borne by the government). Tax compliance costs are those costs “incurred by taxpayers, or third parties such as businesses, in meeting the requirements laid upon them in complying with a given structure and level of tax” (Sandford, Godwin and Hardwick, 1989, p. 10). Indirect administrative costs are mainly connected to the costs of complying with tax requirements - it includes the costs of labour/time consumed in completion of tax activities, filling out forms, record keeping, the fees paid to professional tax advisers, transfer pricing and many more.

Compliance costs 
Tax compliance costs are the costs "incurred by taxpayers, or third parties such as businesses, in meeting the requirements laid upon them in complying with a given structure and level of tax”. There is no consensus about what should and should not be included under the definition of compliance costs. However, there is a possibility to define some indisputable examples of costs, that are directly connected to the compliance of individual taxpayers. These examples include the costs of labor and time required for the completion of tax activities, such as acquiring the necessary knowledge to operate within the tax system properly, or compiling and creating all documents needed. More examples include the cost of purchasing professional assistance for the completion of tax activities, or other expenses connected to tax activities, such as purchasing software and hardware.

Other types of compliance costs, such as the negative psychological effects on taxpayers as a result of the attempts to comply with the current tax policy, or many types of social costs, are very intangible, and it is, therefore, hard to quantify them, even though the effect of their existence is visible.

Equity vs. Efficiency 
An equity-efficiency tradeoff appears when there is some kind of conflict between maximizing the equity and maximizing economic efficiency. The trade-off between equity and efficiency is at the heart of many discussions of tax policy. Two questions are debated. First, there is disagreement about the nature of the trade-off . To reduce inequality, how much efficiency do we have to give up? Second, there is a disagreement about the relative value to be attributed to the reduction in inequality compared to the reduction in efficiency.

Some people claim that inequality is the central problem of society, and society should simply minimize the extent of inequality, regardless of the consequences to efficiency. Others claim that efficiency is the central issue. These disagreements relate to social choices between equity and efficiency.

Equity 
Equity can be divided into two main groups: horizontal equity and vertical equity.

 Vertical equity
 Vertical equity is a method of taxation based on the principle that the higher the income of an individual is the higher is the personal income tax liability (i.e. as your income goes up, you pay more). Vertical equity is often more achievable than horizontal equity, because horizontal equity is harder to implement - it is not easy to define and it can be undermined by loopholes and deductions. Since this method take into consideration the ability to pay of taxpayers, nowadays it is one of the most accepted taxation methods by various countries around the world.
 The ability to pay principle, says that the amount of a tax a person pays has to be dependent on the burden the tax will create with regard to the wealth of an individual. Vertical equity operates on the principal of people with higher incomes paying more taxes, through progressive tax rates. In progressive taxation, the amount of taxes paid increases with income. In this tax system people are divided in tax brackets, each tax bracket has a different tax rate, with high income brackets paying more taxes. With this taxation system, the effective tax rates increase with income. Furthermore, another possibility is the proportional tax method in which the income is charged  at a single rate regardless of income. This taxation method  is also known as flat taxes.
 Horizontal equity
The basic principle of horizontal equity is based on the concept of distributive justice, in which taxpayers should pay the same level of income tax in proportion to their respective income groups. Most important, but more costly is to define income groups, knowing that each individual consumes and saves in different ways, making it very hard for tax policymakers. Horizontal equity requires a tax system that it does not give preference to certain individuals or companies. It makes sure that we don´t have discrimination on the grounds. Horizontal equity is a constant topic of tax policy discussions and in many countries it is a cause of several exemptions, deductions and special provisions.

Efficiency 
Efficiency for economists is equal to the concept of Pareto efficiency. Pareto efficiency means the situation of resource allocation where the concept of 'net' is dominant. In other word, basically we need to make someone worse in order to make others better under this efficiency. To seek for the efficiency, it is necessary to build the decentralized market mechanism. And to build that mechanism, tax system is often seen as an obstacle. Here, we need to think about the balance between efficiency and equity. And the best point of this balance is called 'Pareto improvement'. This is the ideal answer to reply for the question of which policies should be implemented.

Social Choice 
The choices or decision of government are one of social choices. And social choice consists of two elements. First, it is the individual level. Second, it is the society's level. As far as the individual level, each individual builds their preference and has their utility following the budget's constraint and so on. This can make the indifference curve. And we can say that the points which are on this curve are matched to pareto efficiency. In the society's level, the curve are created by seeing the participants as group A and group B. Here, the curve becomes the inverse proportional one which is very common style in the Pareto efficiency's curve. In this curve, when group A's utility will get down, group B's utility will get increased. The relation between them is like trade-off style. This is the very typical example of social indifference curve (There are other curves in other ways: Utilitarian way and Rawlsian way. And I will introduce them in the below paragraph). In the above, I mentioned about the thinking way or the process of social choice. Now, when we try to take some policies, we need to measure the net benefits of different groups and to think about if the project is the Pareto improvement. If the project has the net positive gains and reduces measured inequality, it should be taken. If it is not so clear to understand so, we need to have other points to judge. Basically, there are three ways to do so: the compensation principle, the trade-off across measures of efficiency and equality, and the weighted benefits approach. The latter two are relatively easy to understand. The trade-off one is the judgement based on the contemplation of efficiency and equality. The weighted benefits approach is focused on the total amount of utility. When we think about the compensation principle, we need to care about the willingness to pay the tax. If people are motivated to pay, the consumer surplus is getting higher. And in this principle, when the willingness to pay is more than the cost to do so (even when the cost is higher for some people), the projects should be taken. The compensation principle can overcome the difficulty of taxation due to the intervening efficiency.

Tax policy in the European union

Main principles and objectives

No unified tax policy 
the EU Commission stated the belief that "there is no need for an across the board harmonization of Member States' tax systems.". Member states are to take full control of which tax system they want to impose, as long as they respect the rules of the EU. There is a possibility for tax field action of the EU under the principles of subsidiarity and proportionality, and also under the assumption that the member state in question was not able to provide an effective solution, therefore there is need for support in terms of coordination for example.

Removing obstacles 
As a part of the EU's objective to empower its citizens to play a full part in the market, the organization announced in 2020 that the objective is to ensure that tax rules do not discourage individuals from benefiting from the internal market. The Communication "Removing cross-border tax obstacles for EU citizens" outlines the most serious tax problems that EU citizens face in cross-border situations, such as discrimination, and double taxation.

See also 
 Tax incidence
 Tax law
 Tax policy

References